David Keenan (born 1971) is a Scottish author.

David Keenan may also refer to:

 David Keenan (Gaelic footballer), Gaelic footballer
 David Keenan (musician), Irish singer-songwriter
 Dave Keenan (born 1951), Canadian politician

See also
 David A. Keene (born 1945), American political consultant, Presidential advisor, and newspaper editor